The PNG Rules Football Council is the governing body for the sport of Australian rules football in Papua New Guinea.

It works closely with AFL PNG, the development body, as well as the Australian Football League.

See also

Australian rules football in Papua New Guinea
List of Australian rules football leagues outside Australia

References

External links

Australian rules football governing bodies outside Australia
Australian rules football in Papua New Guinea
Sports organizations established in 1978
1978 establishments in Papua New Guinea